The Church of Saint Paul is a church in Mirabello, Ferrara, Italy. It was damaged in the 2012 Northern Italy earthquakes.

References

External link 
 

Churches in the province of Ferrara